J. Phil Carlton was born on January 14, 1938, in Rocky Mount, North Carolina. He attended South Edgecombe High School in Pinetops, North Carolina, where he served as student body president. Carlton received his bachelor's degree from North Carolina State College in 1960. In 1959-60 he served as an assistant campaign manager in the gubernatorial campaign of Terry Sanford.  He received his J.D. from University of North Carolina at Chapel Hill in 1963. He practiced law in Tarboro, NC from 1963-1968 and served as administrative assistant to Federal Judge L. Richardson Preyer in Greensboro, NC in 1964.

In 1968, he was elected district court judge for the 7th Judicial District of North Carolina and appointed chief judge by Chief Justice R. Hunt Parker. He was reelected for in 3 general elections to 4 year terms.. He served in that position until 1977 when  Gov. Jim Hunt appointed Carlton as the first Secretary for the North Carolina Department of Crime Control. In 1979, he was appointed by Governor Jim Hunt to the NC Court of Appeals. He was then elected to the North Carolina Supreme Court and served as an associate justice until February, 1983 when he resigned to return to the private practice of law.

In 1983, he was a founding partner in the North Carolina law firm of Poyner & Spruill until 1994 and practiced in the Raleigh, NC office. During these years and until he retired in 2012 he served as chief executive officer of State Capital Law Firm Group, one of the largest international law firm associations. According to the group's website, "he and 17 former state governors formed the organization in 1989 when he was a partner at North Carolina member firm Poyner & Spruill LLP. He was elected as State Capital Group's first chairman in 1989 and served in that capacity until 1993, when he became CEO."

The son of a successful tobacco farmer, Carlton negotiated on the industry's behalf in the run-up to the Tobacco Master Settlement Agreement in the 1990s.

Public Safety. He returned to the bench in 1979, serving as a judge on the North Carolina Court of Appeals and then as an associate justice of the North Carolina Supreme Court. Carlton resigned from the Court in 1983 and was replaced by Henry Frye.

Carlton is the former chairman for the Board of Trustees at North Carolina Wesleyan College. He received its Honorary Doctor of Laws degree in 1979.

References

State Capital Group biography
PBS/Frontline biographical data

North Carolina State University alumni
University of North Carolina School of Law alumni
State cabinet secretaries of North Carolina
North Carolina Court of Appeals judges
Justices of the North Carolina Supreme Court
1938 births
Living people